Ethmia maracandica is a moth in the family Depressariidae. It was described by Rebel in 1901. It is found in Uzbekistan and Russia.

Adults are similar to Ethmia lugubris.

References

Moths described in 1901
maracandica